was a Japanese manga artist born in Suma Ward of Kobe City in Hyōgo Prefecture. His personal name was originally spelled , with the same pronunciation. His works include Tetsujin 28-go, Giant Robo, Akakage, Babel II, Sally the Witch, Princess Comet, and adaptations of the Chinese classics Water Margin and Romance of the Three Kingdoms.

Early life 
Yokoyama spent his boyhood during World War II and was evacuated to Tottori with his family. 
He graduated from Kobe municipal Ota junior high school and went on to the Kobe municipal Suma high school.
Osamu Tezuka's "Metropolis" made a deep impression on Yokoyama who wished to become a manga artist in earnest and so he contributed his works to a comic book in his high school days.
He entered the Sumitomo Mitsui Banking Corporation after graduation from high school, but quit his job before five months passed because there was no time to draw a manga.
He found a new job as a publicity department member for a movie company based in Kobe and pursued his manga artist career on his free time.

Career
Yokoyama came out with the book "" for his manga artist début, which caught Osamu Tezuka's attention.

In 1955, Yokoyama had a title serialized in the magazine Shōjo for the first time, "".

In 1956, "Tetsujin 28-go" appeared serially in the shōnen magazine after he resigned from the movie company.
"Tetsujin 28-go" became a popular work equal to Tezuka's Astro Boy and its animated adaptation also made a smashing success. This prompted Yokoyama to become a full-time manga artist and to move to Tokyo the same year.

In 1964, he established Hikari Production, an incorporated company.
With the writing of "" (1967–1971) and Yokoyama Mitsuteru Sangokushi (Records of Three Kingdoms) (1971–1986), he began a new chapter in his career as he drew mostly comics based on original stories with material from China's and Japan's History.

In 1991, Yokoyama Mitsuteru Sangokushi won the prize for excellence from the Japan Cartoonist Association and an animated version was broadcast on TV Tokyo.

In July 1997, Yokoyama was hospitalized with myocardial infarction and had an operation. He returned to work in next year March.

In 2004, while under medical treatment, Yokoyama won the MEXT Prize of the Japan Cartoonist Association.

On the morning of April 15, 2004, Yokoyama suffered burns all over his body due to a fire breaking out in his house. His condition deteriorated and he fell in a coma. Yokoyama died in the hospital near his home at 10:00 P.M. on the same day, aged 69.

Style 

The attractions of Yokoyama's works are calculated story deployment and an elaborate setting. On the other hand, Yokoyama liked light characterizations and didn't let characters show their feelings too much. He was better at a serious story manga rather than with comedy, though he nonetheless drew comics in the latter genre.

While Tezuka established the technique to draw Japanese comics, it was Yokoyama who established the format of various genres of current Japanese comics and anime. Whereas many comic artists prefer their original stories not to be changed when adapted, Yokoyama was realistic and tolerant, so many of his works were made into animation or Tokusatsu.
 Tetsujin 28 & Giant Robo began the Mecha anime & manga genre.
  & Kamen no Ninja Akakage are ninja manga which started a ninja boom. These comics present stories in which ninjas are endowed with superhuman fighting capabilities.
  is a Jidaigeki in which people of the real world appear.
 Sally the Witch, one of the first magical girl manga/anime & Princess Comet are shōjo manga.
 Yokoyama Mitsuteru Sangokushi is a historical story based on historical facts and historical novels.
 Babel II is a supernatural power science fiction comic.

Influence 

Katsuhiro Otomo has cited Yokoyama as an influence and said his own series Akira has the "same overall plot" as Tetsujin 28-go. Additionally, some of its characters are also known as numbers 25, 26, 27 and 28 in homage to Tetsujin 28-go. Hirohiko Araki said that he was conscious of Yokoyama's hard-boiled style in that he sticks to suspense and describes hero characters drily. Araki also said that Jotaro Kujo wearing his school uniform in the desert has its roots in Yokoyama's Babel II, and that if he were to draw Stardust Crusaders over again, he would base the Stands on Tetsujin 28-go.

References

External links

Mitsuteru Yokoyama Official Website (Japanese)

 
1934 births
2004 deaths
Accidental deaths in Japan
Deaths from fire in Japan
Gekiga creators
Manga artists from Hyōgo Prefecture
Mechanical designers (mecha)
People from Kobe